The La Planada poison frog (Paruwrobates andinus) is a species of frog in the family Dendrobatidae endemic to Colombia. Its natural habitats are subtropical or tropical moist montane forests and rivers.
It is threatened by habitat loss, and listed as critically endangered by IUCN.

References

Ameerega
Amphibians of Colombia
Endemic fauna of Colombia
Amphibians described in 1987
Taxonomy articles created by Polbot